The uncertain worm lizard (Amphisbaena dubia) is a worm lizard species in the family Amphisbaenidae. It is endemic to Brazil.

References

Amphisbaena (lizard)
Reptiles described in 1924
Taxa named by Lorenz Müller
Endemic fauna of Brazil
Reptiles of Brazil